Patricia Paola Fernández Silanes (born 23 June 1971), better known as Nona Fernández, is a Chilean actress, author, and screenwriter. She is a recipient of the Sor Juana Inés de la Cruz Prize, and the Altazor prize (on many occasions).

Biography
An only child of a single mother, Nona Fernández grew up in a Matta Avenue neighborhood close to the market Persa Bíobío. There she had her first job, selling second-hand clothes.

Even though her name is the same as her mother's, Patricia Paola, everyone calls her Nona, the name by which she also signs her works. When she was just starting to walk, she used to talk little, hardly saying anything. All she could say was 'no'. Turning this negative into her child's pet word earned her the peculiar nickname "Nonito" among her family. When she got older, the nickname became Nona.

She attended Santa Cruz School in Santiago and later the Catholic University Theater School.

Later, as an actress, she founded the company Merri Melodys, participated in productions of many theatrical works, and won a competition of the Centro Chileno-Norteamericano de Cultura as the best actress.

In 1995, she participated in a workshop given by Antonio Skármeta, the same year she won the Gabriela Mistral Literary Games. Her stories were first published in various anthologies of contests, and her first book of short stories, El Cielo, was published in 2000. Her award-winning novel Mapocho was published two years later.

Regarding the genesis of that first novel, she states:

Fernández has been included by some critics in the so-called Literatura de los hijos.

Her husband, Dante's father, is the writer and theatre director Marcelo Leonart, whom she met when they were both studying at the Theatre School. Together they run the company La Fusa.

Nona describes herself with these words: "Actress for fun. Narrator for being a nuisance, trying not to forget what should not be forgotten. Scriptwriter for soap operas because of necessity. An uncomfortable Chilean, and sometimes rabid".

Her work as a screenwriter for TV series is for Nona Fernández only a way to make a living. On TVN, she has become the scriptwriter for El laberinto de Alicia. Also, she contributes to the series Los archivos del cardenal, based on the cases defended by the Vicariate of Solidarity during Augusto Pinochet's dictatorship. She also co-wrote 's film 199 recetas para ser feliz (199 Tips to be Happy) and the documentary La ciudad de los fotógrafos (City of Photographers) by Sebastián Moreno.

She made her debut as a playwright in 2012, with El taller, a play inspired by the literary salon that Mariana Callejas held in her home in Lo Curro while her husband, Michael Townley, directed the underground operations of a DINA headquarters. This black comedy performed by Leonart and Fernández's company, La Fusa, premiered in April at the Santiago theater Lastarria 90 and re-shown in August at the Centro Cultural Gabriela Mistral. It won the Premio Altazor 2013 in the Theater art category. Her second piece, Liceo de niñas, premiered in 2015 (with this, the company led by Nona and Leonart is now called Pieza Oscura); it is "a fantastic comedy about an overwhelmed science teacher who discovers in his school's laboratory three students who have been hidden since a 1985 protest occupation."

Works

Novels
 2002: Mapocho, Planeta

A novel that portrays, through different symbols and metaphors, Chile's biography and the role of the Official History as a speech of power on the structuring of an identity.

 2007: Av. 10 de Julio Huamachuco, Uqbar

Work that represents classic children's fears that most of the time cross the time barrier and continue tormenting until adulthood.

 2012: Fuenzalida, Mondadori, Santiago

A maze of fantastical stories that intertwine with one another and suggest that is impossible to close the eyes before memories, be they personal or collective.

 2013: Space invaders, Alquimia, Santiago.

Dreams of a generation turned into nightmares that until today torture them at night. Dreams of children that witnessed Pinochet's dictatorship.

 2015: Chilean Electric, Alquimia, Santiago

A novel to understand and explore family history, turning it into an illumination of the "fearsome darkness" that has reigned in the history of Chile with its missing, murdered, and hanged men. A novel inspired, at the same time, by wooden horses, a typewriter, and the corpse of a president who said, "more passion and more affection."

 2016: La dimensión desconocida, Penguin Random House, Santiago 2021 The Twilight Zone (English Translation) Graywolf Press

In the middle of the Chilean dictatorship, an anguished man arrives at the offices of an opposition magazine. He is an agent of the secret service. "I want to speak", he says, and a journalist turns on her voice recorder to listen to a testimony that opens the doors to a hitherto unknown dimension.

Short stories

 2000: El Cielo, Cuarto Propio. Santiago

Seven stories marked by love and redemption or redemption through love. Stories where rules do not exist, everything counts, and everyone counts. What is important is that no one is actually more important. Everyone has a place, a niche, a heaven to go to.

In anthologies
 1994: Música ligera (Grijalbo)
 1996: Pasión por la música (Lom)
 1997: Cuentos extraviados (Alfaguara; with "Blanca")
 1998:  (with "El Cielo")

Theatrical dramas
 El taller: released in April 2012; published in the book Bestiario, freakshow temporada 1973/1990, together with Grita (2004, by Marcelo Leonart) and Medusa (2010, by Ximena Carrera): Ceibo Ediciones, Santiago, 2013
  Liceo de niñas: released on 23 October 2015 by the company Pieza Oscura at the Theater of the Catholic University, with direction by Marcelo Leonart and acting by the author, among others, who plays the role of a mute student. Published by Ediciones Oxímoron in 2016.

Television series scripts

Original stories
 2011: El Laberinto de Alicia (rewritten in 2014 as the Colombian series El laberinto de Alicia with Tania Cárdenas and Santiago Ardila)
 2005:  (with Marcelo Leonart, and Ximena Carrera)
 2003:  (with Marcelo Leonart)

Adaptations
 2013: Secretos en el jardín – originally by Julio Rojas y Matías Ovalle
 2011: Los archivos del cardenal – originally by 
 2009: ¿Dónde está Elisa? – originally by Pablo Illanes
 2007: Alguien te mira – originally by Pablo Illanes
 2004:  – originally by Marcelo Leonart
 2002:  – originally by 
 1999: Aquelarre – originally by Hugo Morales
 1998: Iorana – originally by Enrique Cintolesi

English translations 

 Space Invaders. Translated by Natasha Wimmer. Minneapolis, MN: Graywolf Press, 2019.

Awards and recognitions
 1995: First place of the Gabriela Mistral Literary Games, for the story "Marsellesa"
 1996: First prize in the Passion for Music literary contest
 1997: Finalist in the Paula magazine story contest, for "Blanca"
 1998: Finalist in Paula magazine story contest, for "El Cielo"
 2000: Finalist for the Altazor Award in the TV Script category with Aquelarre (ex aequo)
 2003: Santiago Municipal Literature Award for Mapocho
 2004: Finalist for the Altazor Award in the TV Script category with 16 (ex aequo)
 2006: Altazor Award in the TV Script category for Los treinta (ex aequo)
 2008: Altazor Award in the TV Script category for Alguien te Mira (ex aequo)
 2008: Santiago Municipal Literature Award for Av. 10 de Julio Huamachuco
 2010: Finalist for the Altazor Award in the TV Script category with Conde Vrolok (ex aequo)
 2010: Finalist for the Altazor Award in the TV Script category with ¿Dónde está Elisa? (ex aequo)
 2012: Altazor Award in the TV Script category for Los archivos del cardenal (ex aequo)
 2013: Altazor Award in the Dramaturgy category for El taller
 2016: Award of the National Council of Culture and the Arts for the best novel in the Published Works category for Chilean Electric
 2017: Sor Juana Inés de la Cruz Prize for La dimensión desconocida
2019: Longlisted for the 2019 National Book Award for Translated Literature.

References

External links
 
 

1971 births
20th-century Chilean women writers
20th-century Chilean novelists
21st-century Chilean women writers
21st-century Chilean novelists
Chilean stage actresses
Living people
Telenovela writers
Women soap opera writers
Chilean women novelists